The 2009–10 UAB Blazers men's basketball team represented the University of Alabama at Birmingham in the 2009–10 NCAA Division I men's basketball season. This was head coach Mike Davis's fourth season at UAB. The Blazers competed in Conference USA and played their home games at Bartow Arena. They finished the season 25–9, 11–5 in CUSA play and lost in the quarterfinals of the 2010 Conference USA men's basketball tournament. They were invited to the 2010 National Invitation Tournament and advanced to the quarterfinals before falling to North Carolina.

Roster
Source

Schedule and results
Source
All times are Eastern

|-
!colspan=9| Exhibition

|-
!colspan=9| Regular Season

|-
!colspan=9| 2010 Conference USA men's basketball tournament

|-
!colspan=9| 2010 National Invitation Tournament

See also
UAB Blazers men's basketball
2009–10 Conference USA men's basketball season

Rankings

*AP does not release post-NCAA Tournament rankings^Coaches did not release a Week 2 poll.

References

UAB Blazers men's basketball seasons
UAB
UAB